Safia Firozi is an Afghan pilot. She is the second female pilot in the Afghan Army.
In August 2021 she was said to have been killed by the Taliban, but the news and images were fake.
She wants to continue her career as a pilot.

References

Afghan aviators
Afghan female military personnel
Women aviators
Women military aviators
Year of birth missing (living people)